Penn Farms is an unincorporated community and census-designated place (CDP) in Blair County, Pennsylvania, United States. It was first listed as a CDP prior to the 2020 census.

The CDP is in south-central Blair County, in the northern part of Blair Township. It is bordered to the northeast by Hollidaysburg, the county seat, and to the north by Duncansville. Interstate 99 forms the northwestern edge of the CDP, and Pennsylvania Route 36 forms the eastern edge.

Demographics

References 

Census-designated places in Blair County, Pennsylvania
Census-designated places in Pennsylvania